Petr Kelemen (born 18 November 2000) is a Czech track and road cyclist, who currently rides for UCI ProTeam .

Major results

2018
 National Junior Road Championships
1st  Road race
2nd Time trial
 1st  Points classification Tour du Pays de Vaud
2020
 2nd Time trial, National Under-23 Road Championships
 8th Overall Dookoła Mazowsza
2021
 3rd Overall Dookoła Mazowsza
 8th GP Slovenian Istria
2022
 National Under-23 Road Championships
1st  Road race
2nd Time trial
 2nd Strade Bianche di Romagna
 4th La Maurienne
2023
 10th Grand Prix La Marseillaise

References

External links

2000 births
Living people
Czech male cyclists
Cyclists at the 2018 Summer Youth Olympics